Sami Abdullah Al-Jaber (born 11 December 1972) is a Saudi Arabian football manager and former professional player who played as a striker. He spent the entirety of his career with Al-Hilal apart from a five-month loan to English club Wolverhampton Wanderers.

Al-Jaber is his country's second highest international goalscorer with 46 goals in 156 internationals from 1992 to 2006. He appeared in four consecutive FIFA World Cup tournaments, from 1994 to 2006, scoring in three of them. He was also a member of the Saudi squads which won the AFC Asian Cup in 1996. He is widely regarded as one of the greatest Saudi footballers ever.

Club career
Al-Jaber made his Al-Hilal debut in 1989 and spent nearly 20 years at the club. In 2000, he joined Wolverhampton Wanderers on loan, where he made just five appearances in five months. After the club learned that Al-Jaber's father had been taken seriously ill, he was allowed to join United Arab Emirates side Al-Ain on loan, and this was to spell the end of his time in England. Even so, to this day Al-Jaber remains one of very few Saudi footballers to play outside their homeland.

On 21 January 2008, Al-Hilal held a testimonial for Al-Jaber against English Premier League giants Manchester United. Al-Jaber scored a penalty en route to a 3–2 victory over the visitors, in his last game for the club.

International career
On 27 May 1998, Al-Jaber made his 100th international appearance in a friendly against Norway. At 25 years, four months and 16 days old, this made him the youngest male footballer to reach 100 caps.

After gaining a runners-up medal in the 2000 Asian Cup, he appeared in the 2002 World Cup but only played in one game, a 0–8 hammering by Germany. He was ruled out of the rest of the competition when his appendix burst and he had to be rushed to hospital.

Managerial career
Al-Jaber was named as assistant coach of Al-Hilal in 2009, one year after he retired from professional football. He worked under notable coaches like Eric Gerets, Gabriel Calderon and Thomas Doll. In 2012, he became assistant coach of Ligue 2 side AJ Auxerre.

On 27 May 2013, Al-Jaber was named the manager of Al-Hilal, replaced former coach Zlatko Dalić. He became the first Saudi coach to manage Al-Hilal after 14 years of Khalil Ibrahim Al-Zayani in 1999. After his first season in his new career, he was ranked 19th in Football Coach World ranking. Even though, Al-Hilal decided to replace him. On 19 July 2014, Al Arabi announced his assignment as the technical manager of their football team.

Personal life
Al-Jaber is an advocate of football reforms, having criticised the Saudi Football Federation for its protectionist policy that prevented Saudi talents from going abroad to play better football after Saudi Arabia became the first team to be knocked out of 2002 FIFA World Cup.

Career statistics

Club

International
Scores and results list Saudi Arabia's goal tally first, score column indicates score after each Al-Jaber goal.

Honours
Al-Hilal
 Saudi Premier League: 1989–90, 1995–96, 1997–98, 2001–02, 2004–05
 Crown Prince Cup: 1995, 2000, 2003, 2004–05, 2005–06
 Saudi Federation Cup: 1990, 1993, 1996, 2000
 Saudi Founder's Cup: 2000
 AFC Champions League: 2000
 Asian Cup Winners Cup: 1996–97, 2001–02
 Asian Super Cup: 1997
 Arab Champions League: 1994, 1995
 Arab Super Cup: 2001
 Gulf Club Champions Cup: 1998
 Saudi-Egyptian Super Cup: 2001

Saudi Arabia
AFC Asian Cup: 1996; runner-up: 2000
FIFA Confederations Cup runner-up: 1992
Gulf Cup of Nations: 1994, 2002

Individual
Asian Player of the Month: February 1998
Asian Goal of the Month: April 1998
Saudi Premier League top scorer: 1989–90 (16), 1992–93 (19)
Arab Champions League top scorer: 1994 (7), 2004–05 (9)
1994 Arab Club Champions Cup: Best Player
Gulf Club Champions Cup top scorer: 1998
Arab Club Champions Cup: All Time Top Scorer

See also 
 List of men's footballers with 100 or more international caps

References

External links
 sami al jaber injured 
 Sami Al-Jaber at AlHilal.com
 
 
 
  Official Website

1972 births
Living people
Sportspeople from Riyadh
Saudi Arabian footballers
Saudi Arabia international footballers
Saudi Arabian expatriate footballers
Al Hilal SFC players
Wolverhampton Wanderers F.C. players
Al-Gharafa SC players
English Football League players
1992 King Fahd Cup players
1994 FIFA World Cup players
1995 King Fahd Cup players
1997 FIFA Confederations Cup players
1998 FIFA World Cup players
2002 FIFA World Cup players
2006 FIFA World Cup players
1992 AFC Asian Cup players
1996 AFC Asian Cup players
2000 AFC Asian Cup players
AFC Asian Cup-winning players
FIFA Century Club
Association football forwards
Saudi Arabian football managers
UAE Pro League managers
Al Hilal SFC managers
Al Wahda FC managers
Al Shabab FC (Riyadh) managers
Saudi Professional League players
Expatriate footballers in England
Expatriate footballers in Qatar
Saudi Arabian expatriate sportspeople in England
Saudi Arabian expatriate sportspeople in Qatar